Ahmadabad (also Romanized as Aḩmadābād; also known as Aḩmadābād-e Sarjām) is a village in Sang Bast Rural District, in the Central District of Fariman County, Razavi Khorasan Province, Iran. At the 2006 census, its population was 359, in 106 families.

See also 

 List of cities, towns and villages in Razavi Khorasan Province

References 

Populated places in Fariman County